Beth Cordingly (born 25 October 1976) is an English actress, known for her appearances in series Family Affairs, The Bill and Dead Set.

Early life
Cordingly was born in Brighton and went to Brighton and Hove High School. She is the daughter of writer and historian David Cordingly.

Cordingly went to the University of Birmingham where she gained a double First in English and Drama. She went on to train as an actress at the Webber Douglas Academy of Dramatic Art in London.

Career
She made her first major television appearance in the soap opera, Family Affairs as troubled teenager Sara Warrington; a lapdancer who blew most of her wages on cocaine. She left the soap after a year to play the lead in Noël Coward's Semi-Monde at the Lyric Theatre, West End. The play was directed by Philip Prowse and produced by Thelma Holt. She then played Rose, a cabinet secretary reporting to Derek Jacobi's Major Merton, in Two Men went to War, a film starring Kenneth Cranham and Leo Bill.

In 2002, she joined The Bill as PC Kerry Young. After her departure from the show when her character was murdered in 2004, ITV made an hour-long spin off called Kerry's Story that aired on ITV3.

In 2005 she played Vienna Keen, an exotic dancer, in BBC's Funland and in 2007 played Naomi in Secret Diary of a Call Girl, a call girl who has a threesome together with the shows main protagonist, Hannah, played by Billie Piper.

In March and April 2017, Cordingly appeared as Debbie Morton, Shirley Carter's (Linda Henry) cellmate in British soap opera EastEnders.

She has played a variety of roles on television, notably filming two series for Charlie Brooker, playing Veronica in his zombie series Dead Set and featuring in his sketch show, How TV Ruined Your Life with Kevin Eldon.

In theatre she has worked nationally and abroad. In 2006 she played the role of Nina in the Menier Chocolate Factory's production of Breakfast with Jonny Wilkinson. In 2013, it was made into an independent feature film and she reprised her role, this time opposite George MacKay, Nigel Lindsay and Norman Pace. When playing Amy in Salt at Manchester Royal Exchange she was nominated for the Manchester Evening News Award for Best Performance in a Studio Production (2010). She worked with Sharon Gless on A Round Heeled Woman in the West End (2012) and has twice played lead roles in Feydeau farces for Sam Walters at the Orange Tree Theatre. In 2012 she played Louisa in Children's Children at the Almeida Theatre, a play directed by Jeremy Herrin and written by Matthew Dunster. In 2015, Dunster directed her in Love's Sacrifice for the RSC, in the Swan Theatre, Stratford-upon-Avon. In the same RSC season she played Bellamira in The Jew of Malta, starring Jasper Britton.

Writing
Cordingly has an MA in creative writing from Birkbeck, University of London. In 2009, her short story Marianne and Ellie was selected by Sarah Waters to be published in an anthology of short stories, Dancing with Mr. Darcy. In 2012, she won the Litro magazine Double Dutch short story competition for her short story about Amsterdam, The Bike Ride.

Charity work
Cordingly is an Ambassador for ChildLine and regularly speaks on their behalf. She ran the London Marathon in 2004 for them and spoke at the 2006 Anti-bullying week conference at Westminster Central Hall. In 2009 she was given an award at the House of Commons of the United Kingdom for her outstanding contributions to the NSPCC.

Filmography

TV and film

Theatre

References

External links
 Official website
 
 Beth Cordingly at Spotlight
 Cordingly interview at icSouthlondon

1976 births
Living people
English soap opera actresses
English television actresses
People from Brighton
Actresses from Brighton
National Society for the Prevention of Cruelty to Children people